Emil Doepler (29 October 1855, Munich - 21 December 1922, Berlin) was a German illustrator, graphic artist, and heraldist. He is usually referred to as The Younger, to distinguish him from his father.

Life and work 
He was born to Carl Emil Doepler, an illustrator and designer, who was head of the costume department at the Bayreuth Festival. He was also Emil's first teacher. Heraldry was among his earliest interests, but he also created landscapes and still-lifes. 

Upon graduating, in 1873, he worked as a free-lance illustrator. From 1876 to 1877, he took further lessons at the Prussian Academy of Arts. In 1881, he became a teacher at the Museum. In 1888, he designed the coat-of-arms for the Börsenverein des Deutschen Buchhandels, featuring Habent sua fata libelli (books have their destiny), the motto of the German publishing industry. He was promoted to Professor in 1889. 

He also designed advertising materials, signs, and trading card pictures for the Stollwerck chocolate company. Other committee members included Woldemar Friedrich, Bruno Schmitz and Franz Skarbina. They also acted as judges for competitions. This was intended to give the cards a higher artistic value.

In 1899, he designed several variations of the company name, in an Art Nouveau font. Later, one of his students, combined the lettering with a three-point crown, to create the company's logo. He married Hirsch in 1909. They had no children.

In November of 1919, Friedrich Ebert, President of the Weimar Republic, declared one of Doepler's designs to be Germany's official coat-of-arms. It served in that function until 1928. After that, it became an escutcheon; used for certain specific ceremonial purposes, such as a pennon for official vehicles. In 1949, West Germany began employing it for the same purposes. His designs also serve as the coats-of-arms for the cities of Essen and Bochum.

References

Further reading 
 Gernot Blum: Aufbruch in die Moderne – Das Exlibris um 1900,an article from Die Heraldiker, Wiesbaden 1990, 
 "Doepler, Emil", in: Detlef Lorenz: Reklamekunst um 1900. Künstlerlexikon für Sammelbilder. Berlin : Reimer, 2000, pg.82 ff. 
 Aynsley, Jeremy, Graphic Design in Germany: 1890-1945, University of California Press, 2000

External links 

  Illustrations from Walhall: Die Götterwelt der Germanen by Wilhelm Ranisch, 1905
 

German illustrators
1855 births
1922 deaths
Art Nouveau illustrators
Artists from Munich